Carlos Eduardo Robledo Puch (born 22 January 1952), also known as The Angel of Death and The Black Angel, is an Argentine serial killer. He was convicted of eleven murders (including the killing of at least one accomplice), one attempted murder, seventeen robberies, involvement in one rape and one attempted rape, one count of sexual abuse, two kidnappings and two thefts. Most of the offences occurred in the northern area of Greater Buenos Aires.

Early life
In 1956, when Robledo Puch was four years old, his parents moved the family to Borges Street, Olivos, Buenos Aires Province, where they rented a first floor apartment above a hardware store. Robledo Puch came from a working-class family and was a shy child.

Criminal activity

On 15 March 1971, Robledo Puch and his accomplice, Jorge Antonio Ibañez, robbed the nightclub Enamor, stealing 350,000 pesos. Before fleeing, Robledo Puch, using a Ruby pistol, killed the club's owner and the night watchman while they slept.

On 9 May 1971 at 4 am, Robledo Puch and Ibañez broke into a Mercedes Benz spare parts store in Vicente López. In one of the rooms, they found a couple with their newborn baby. Robledo Puch shot and killed the man and shot the woman, who only sustained gunshot injuries. Ibañez attempted to rape the injured woman. The woman survived the ordeal and later testified at the trial. Before fleeing with 400,000 pesos, Robledo Puch shot at the crib where the newborn lay crying, but he missed.

On 24 May 1971, both criminals killed a night watchman in a supermarket.

On 13 June 1971, Ibañez raped a 16 year-old girl in the backseat of a stolen car, after which Robledo Puch killed the teenager by shooting her five times. On 24 June 1971, they drove to the same location and repeated the crime - Ibañez attempted to rape a 23 year-old woman, whom Robledo Puch executed afterwards by shooting seven times.

On 5 August 1971, Ibañez died in a suspicious car accident. Robledo Puch was driving and fled from the scene unscathed.

On 15 November 1971, Robledo Puch and his new accomplice, Héctor Somoza, stormed a supermarket in Boulogne and, using a .32 caliber Astra pistol that they had obtained a few days prior in the robbery of an armory, riddled the scene with bullets.

Between 17 November 1971 and 24 November 1971, they broke into two car dealerships and murdered the watchmen, stealing over 1,000,000 pesos.

Arrest
On 1 February 1972, Robledo Puch and Somoza broke into a hardware store. They killed the watchman and tried to open the safe with the keys they obtained from his body. They were unable to do so and, allegedly in a state of confusion during which Robledo Puch apparently was startled by something, he shot Somoza and killed him. In order to impede or prevent identification of his accomplice's body by police investigators, he took a blowtorch and burned the face of Somoza. After opening the safe with the same blowtorch, he took the money he found there and fled the scene. He was arrested on 4 February 1972, after his identity card was found in Somoza's pants pocket. He had just turned 20.

Trial, reclusion, and present day
He was tried in 1980 and sentenced to life imprisonment, the maximum sentence in Argentina, to be served in the high-security prison of Sierra Chica, near the city of Olavarria. The last words he spoke before the court were "This was a Roman circus. I was judged and sentenced beforehand."

Part of the contents of the file of a psychiatrist who examined him, presented at trial, read:
"Robledo Puch comes from a legitimate and complete home, absent from unfavorable hygienic and moral circumstances."
"There were also no economic constraints of importance, reverses of fortune, abandonment of the home, lack of work, personal misfortune, illness, affective conflicts, overcrowding or promiscuity."

In July 2000, he became eligible for parole; he did not, however, submit a petition.

On 27 May 2008, Robledo Puch submitted a petition of request to be paroled. The judge who reviewed his petition denied him parole considering him to still be a threat to society.

In November 2013, he requested a review of his sentence or, failing that, his execution by a lethal injection even though the death penalty was not legal in Argentina. The Supreme Court of Justice denied both the request for review and the request for execution, the latter of which would have been illegal.

On 27 March 2015, the Supreme Court of Justice rejected an appeal filed by Robledo Puch against the aforementioned judicial decision whereby he was denied parole.

In 2018, a film based on Robledo Puch called El Angel, directed by Luis Ortega and starring Lorenzo Ferro, was released.

, Robledo Puch has spent over 50 years in prison, making him the longest-serving prisoner in South America.

See also
List of serial killers by country
List of serial killers by number of victims
Cayetano Santos Godino
Mateo Banks

References

Bibliography 

1952 births
Argentine people convicted of murder
Argentine rapists
Argentine serial killers
Living people
Male serial killers
People convicted of murder by Argentina
People from Buenos Aires
Prisoners sentenced to life imprisonment by Argentina